Fenerbahçe Ülker is the professional men's basketball department of Fenerbahçe S.K., a major multisport club based in Istanbul, Turkey.

For the season roster: 2007-08 Roster

Euroleague 2007-08

Regular season Group C

All times given below are in Central European Time.

Unless otherwise indicated, all attendance totals are from the corresponding match report posted on the official Euroleague site and included with each game summary.

Top 16 Group E

All times given below are in Central European Time.

Unless otherwise indicated, all attendance totals are from the corresponding match report posted on the official Euroleague site and included with each game summary.

Quarter final

Each quarterfinal is a best-of-three (if third serie necessary) series between a first-place team in the Top 16 and a second-place team from a different group, with the first-place team receiving home advantage. Quarterfinals will be played on April 1 and April 3, 2008, with third games to be played April 10 if necessary.

References

External links
Official Fenerbahçe site 
Fenerbahçe Ulker 
Euro League Page 
TBLStat.net 
Euroleague Format
Euroleague.net

2007-08
2007–08 Euroleague by club
2007–08 in Turkish basketball by club